Joseph McClarence (1885–unknown) was an English footballer who played in the Football League for Bolton Wanderers, Bradford (Park Avenue) and Newcastle United.

References

1885 births
English footballers
Association football forwards
English Football League players
Newcastle United F.C. players
Bolton Wanderers F.C. players
Bradford (Park Avenue) A.F.C. players
Lisburn Distillery F.C. players
Year of death missing